The ADAC Rallye Deutschland is a rally event held in Germany. The event was first held in 1982 and originally hosted by e.g. Frankfurt, Mainz and Koblenz. In 2000, the rally was relocated to the region around Trier. Previously part of the European and German championships, the event was in the World Rally Championship calendar from the 2002 season to 2020 season. The 2020 event was cancelled due to the COVID-19 pandemic.

History

Previously part of the European Rally Championship and the German Rally Championship, the rally was included in the World Rally Championship calendar for the 2002 season. The organisers opted for a split in locations: media center, rally headquarters and the parc ferme were placed in Trier, the parc ferme being a prominent display of all remaining cars on the Viehmarkt, surrounded by restaurants, pubs and special events such as music and the brewery festival. Start and finish ceremonies were also held in Trier in front of the Porta Nigra with the cars making their way through the spectators. Meanwhile, the service park was located roughly 60 km southeast on the shore of the picturesque Bostalsee.

The rally traditionally started with the shakedown close to the servicepark on Thursday morning, before moving to Trier for the showstart. The next three days were separated according to the three different track characteristics. Friday's leg one was held to the northeast of Trier around the Moselle in the vineyards. For afternoon and evening service the cars returned to Bostalsee before heading to Trier and parc-ferme. Saturdays' stages were held on and around the military training grounds of Baumholder, including the famous special stage "Panzerplatte". The day ended with a spectator special stage in the small town of Sankt Wendel. Leg three was held in the northern Saarland around Sankt Wendel, followed by a second pass through the spectator special stage. In the early afternoon the crews returned to Trier for the Finish ceremony.

The existing layout received criticism from fans, teams and the FIA with many complaining about the long liaison between stages, and the town of Trier, especially its small businesses, looking for more involvement by moving Trier into the center of rally.

For the 2007 edition, the layout was modified accordingly. The service park along with the media center moved from Bostalsee to Trier's convention center grounds, which offer better infrastructure and are easier to reach. Fans can park in the streets nearby or make use of special shuttle services serving large parking grounds throughout Trier. Both parking and the service park itself are now mostly based on asphalt making them more weather-safe. The shakedown was relocated to the Luxembourgish border and the stages reorganised altogether, putting more focus on the vineyards close to Trier. As before, Friday consists of stages northeast of Trier. However, the second day now combines both the military grounds of Baumholder with a shortened version of Panzerplatte as well as some of the previous Saarland-stages. Sunday again moves the crews back to the vineyards, before the teams return to Trier for the newly created spectator special stage Circus Maximus. Advertised as the highlight of three days of Rally Germany, this stage is a 4.37 km run through downtown Trier around the Porta Nigra. Four cars enter the track separated by 10 to 20 seconds and drive four laps on the roads of Trier. Fans can watch the stage on specially erected grandstands or simply from the curbside. In 2008, the WRC run through stage was broadcast live on television.

The revised layout received a lot of praise. 2007 saw 15,000 spectators in Circus Maximus alone, with a total attendance of more than 200,000 for all three days. Due to a cutback in the number of rallies included in each season's calendar and the introduction of alternating rallies, Rallye Deutschland was not part of the 2009 calendar. It returned in the 2010 season, with Sébastien Loeb taking his eighth consecutive win; a WRC record for wins in a single event.

Characteristics 

Rally Deutschland is entirely held on asphalt. A significant part of its attraction originates in the mixture of track characteristics encountered throughout the three-day period. This setup has earned it the description of "three rallies in one".

The vineyard stages consist of tight and twisted support roads, with short straights and hairpins in the steep mountains surrounding the Moselle. Fans particularly like the stages because of the close proximity to the cars, sitting on small walls and in between the vines, often less than 2m from the ideal line. However, this layout has also raised serious concerns with the FIA regarding spectator safety. In 2008, the final stage of leg one was cancelled after too many fans where trying to make their way through the vineyards.

The roads on the military training ground, called the panzerplatte or armour flat, near Baumholder are made of rough concrete and surrounded by the dangerous "Hinkelstones" (Calque of "Hinkelstein" meaning Menhir in German) rocks up to a meter in size lining either side the roads as a restraint for military vehicles. The stages are fast and the vast military grounds offer endless spectator points, including the legendary crest known as "Gina". On this terrain small driving-errors almost automatically lead to serious damage to both car and driver, the most prominent victim being Petter Solberg in 2004. Finally, the asphalt roads in the rural northern Saarland are very fast with high-speed curves, only interrupted by some tight turns onto smaller roads.

Besides the different track characteristics, the frequently changing weather makes for additional excitement. Short but strong rainshowers can appear out of nowhere and significantly complicate the tyre-choice. In 2004, Marcus Grönholm became the prominent victim of a rainy morning when he crashed out of the introductory stage on Friday.

Past winners

† — The 1994 rally only counted for the 2-Litre World Cup.

Multiple winners

References

External links

 Official site
 Rallye Deutschland at eWRC-results
.

 
Deutschland
Recurring sporting events established in 1982
Deutschland